Homeworth is an unincorporated community and census-designated place in southwestern Knox Township, Columbiana County, Ohio, United States. The population was 492 as of the 2020 census. It is located in the Salem micropolitan area and the greater Youngstown–Warren area, and has a post office with the ZIP code  44634.

History

Settlement began at what is now Homeworth about 1840.  Homeworth was platted in 1851 when the Cleveland and Pittsburgh Railroad was extended to that point. Early variant names were Winchester and Sandy. A post office called Sandy was established in 1830, and the name was changed to Homeworth in 1869.

Geography
Homeworth is located in northwestern Columbiana County, in the southwestern part of Knox Township. It is located in the valley of Middle Sandy Creek near its headwaters.

Education
Children in Homeworth are served by the West Branch Local School District. The current schools serving Homeworth are:
West Branch Early Learning Center – grades K-2
West Branch Intermediate School – grades 3-4
West Branch Middle School – grades 5-7
West Branch High School – grades 8-12

Notable residents
 Wesley Matthias Stanford – bishop of the United Evangelical Church

References

Census-designated places in Columbiana County, Ohio
Census-designated places in Ohio
1840 establishments in Ohio
Populated places established in 1840